The New Taipei City Yingge Ceramics Museum is a museum presenting ceramics located in Yingge District, New Taipei, Taiwan.

History
The museum opened on 26 November 2000. In March 2016, the museum signed an agreement with Google to include its collections in the art project of Google Cultural Institute.

Exhibitions
The museum houses exhibits as well as a ceramics studio. The permanent exhibits present five major themes:

 Traditional Pottery Techniques Hall
 Once they Were: Development of Taiwan Ceramics
 Pottery Town: History of Yingge
 Shuttle Through Time: Prehistoric/Aboriginal/Contemporary Ceramics
 Future Prediction: Industrial and High-tech Ceramics

There is also an experimental pottery area for children to play with clay, and a pottery workshop for artists and experts to share experiences and thoughts.

Transportation
The museum is accessible within walking distance South West from Yingge Station of Taiwan Railways.

See also
 List of museums in Taiwan

References

External links

Museum e-library

2000 establishments in Taiwan
Art museums established in 2000
Art museums and galleries in Taiwan
Yingge Ceramics Museum
Ceramics museums in Taiwan